Swanbourne is a western coastal suburb of Perth, Western Australia, located within the City of Nedlands. It is an affluent, upper middle class residential area with older Federation style homes, many being renovated. The suburb was established in the late 19th century. New housing estates have been built recently through the redevelopment of areas such as the Swanbourne Senior High School, Swanbourne Primary School and Lakeway Drive-In Cinema sites.

History 

Swanbourne was initially called "Osborne", and was renamed in 1921. The renaming was done in order for the suburb to not be confused with Osborne Park, another suburb in Perth, and after an individual died following an ambulance being sent to the wrong location.

Swanbourne was named for Swanbourne House, in Swanbourne, Buckinghamshire, the family seat of Sir Thomas Fremantle (later Baron Cottesloe), a prominent Conservative politician, and his brother, Sir Charles Fremantle, for whom the city of Fremantle was named.

Geography and population
Swanbourne is bounded by the Swanbourne Rifle Range and Cottesloe Golf Club to the north, Lake Claremont and Stirling Road to the east, the Fremantle railway line and North Street to the south, and the Indian Ocean to the west.

At the 2016 Australian census, Swanbourne had a population of 4,059 people. 69.6% of people were born in Australia. The next most common countries of birth was England at 7.5%. 87.0% of people spoke only English at home. The most common responses for religion were "no religion" 37.4%, Anglican 20.9% and Catholic 19.1%.

There were 1,320 occupied private dwellings in Swanbourne. 78.7% of these were separate houses and 13.0% were semi-detached. Swanbourne is a high income suburb with a median family income of $3,564, compared to $1,910 for Western Australia and $1,734 for Australia. 8.8% of employed residents worked in defence.

Climate
Swanbourne has a hot-summer Mediterranean climate (Köppen climate classification Csa), similar to the rest of the Perth metropolitan region.

Facilities 
Swanbourne includes the 18-hole Cottesloe Golf Club and Swanbourne Beach. Swanbourne is also well known for having one of the only two official nudist beaches (free beaches) in the Perth metropolitan region. The beach, situated on army land and thus not subject to local council authority, is immediately north of the officially named Swanbourne Beach. Allen Park contains a number of sporting facilities, including tennis courts, a football/cricket pitch and a rugby pitch. Also at Allen Park is the relocated Tom Collins House. Tom Collins was a noted Australian author. A veterinary practice in Devon road was originally started by Thomas William Hogarth.

Scotch College, a major independent school for boys, is the suburb's largest employer after the Army.

The Australian Special Air Service Regiment is based at Campbell Barracks within the suburb, which occupies the coastline north of Cottesloe and south of City Beach.

Transport
Swanbourne is served by Swanbourne railway station and by various bus routes that pass through Swanbourne. All services are operated by the Public Transport Authority.

Politics
Swanbourne is part of the federal division of Curtin. The federal seat is held by the centre-right Liberal Party. It is regarded as a safe seat and has been continually retained by the Liberal Party, with the exception of former Liberal member Allan Rocher as an Independent politician between 1996 and 1998. For the parliament of Western Australia, the state electoral district of Cottesloe is also held by the Liberal Party.

References

 
Suburbs of Perth, Western Australia
Nude beaches